St. Jude or Jude the Apostle was one of the Twelve Apostles of Jesus.

St. Jude or Saint Jude may also refer to:

People
Jude, brother of Jesus, one of the brethren of Jesus
St. Jude, the author of the Epistle of Jude
Jude Milhon or St. Jude (1939–2003), hacker and author

Hospitals
St. Jude Children's Research Hospital, Memphis, Tennessee
St. Jude Medical Center, Fullerton, California

Music
Saint Jude (band), a British rock band
St. Jude (album), an album by the Courteeners
"St Jude" (song) a song by Florence and the Machine from How Big, How Blue, How Beautiful
"The Gospel of St Jude", a 1996 song by Orchestral Manoeuvres in the Dark from Universal

Schools
St. Jude College, Cavite, Philippines
Saint Jude College, Manila, Philippines
Saint Jude Catholic School (Manila), a Roman Catholic grade school and high school in San Miguel, Manila, Philippines
St. Jude Educational Institute, a Roman Catholic high school in Montgomery, Alabama, USA
Saint Jude School (Monroe, Connecticut), a grade school

Other uses
St. Jude Classic, a golf tournament in Memphis, Tennessee
St. Jude India, an organisation providing treatment for children with cancer
St. Jude Medical, a company in Saint Paul, Minnesota
St Jude storm a 2013 storm in northwestern Europe
St. Jude, fictional town in The Corrections

See also
St. Jude Church (disambiguation)
St. Jude's (disambiguation)